The Sarasaviya Best Supporting Actress Award is presented annually by the weekly Sarasaviya newspaper in collaboration with the Associated Newspapers of Ceylon Limited at the Sarasaviya Awards Festival. Although the Sarasaviya Awards Ceremony began in 1964, this award was introduced in 1969. Following is a list of the winners of this title since then.

References

Supporting Actress
Awards established in 1969
Film awards for supporting actress